Carlos Ferreira may refer to:

 Carlos Amaral Ferreira, Portuguese Paralympic athlete
 Carlos Ferreira (sailor) (born 1931), Portuguese former sailor
 Carlos Vaz Ferreira (1872–1958), Uruguayan philosopher, writer, and academic
 Carlos Diego Ferreira (born 1985), Brazilian mixed martial artist
 Carlos Ferreira (footballer) (born 1980), Luxembourgian footballer
 Carlos Ferreira de la Torre (1914–1990), Spanish sculptor
 Sebastián Ferreira, also known as Carlos Sebastián Ferreira, (born 1998), Paraguayan footballer